The Southeastern Conference Freshman of the Year is a college softball award given to the Southeastern Conference's most outstanding freshman player. The award has been given annually since 2000.

Key

Winners

Winners by school

References

Awards established in 2000
Freshman
NCAA Division I softball conference freshmen of the year